Abū ʿAbdallāh ʿUmar II ibn Shuʿayb al-Balluti, also Babdel in the Byzantine sources, was the third Emir of Crete, ruling .

The surviving records on the internal history and rulers of the Emirate of Crete are very fragmentary. Following the studies of George C. Miles with the aid of numismatic evidence, he is tentatively identified as a son of the second emir, Shu'ayb, and the grandson of the conqueror of Crete and founder of the Emirate of Crete, Abu Hafs Umar. His reign is placed from c. 880 to c. 895.  According to the Byzantine chronicler Genesios, sometime in the reign of the Byzantine emperor Leo VI the Wise he suffered a shipwreck off the coast of the Peloponnese, and was taken captive by the local governor, Constantine Tessarakontapechys.

According to a letter sent by the Patriarch of Constantinople, Nicholas I Mystikos, to Umar's son Yusuf, Umar had maintained a friendly correspondence with the Patriarch Photios.

References

Sources
 
 
 

9th-century Arabs
9th-century rulers in Europe
Emirs of Crete
Shipwreck survivors
Prisoners and detainees of the Byzantine Empire
People from Crete